"Last Cup of Sorrow" is the third track from Faith No More's sixth studio album Album of the Year. It was released as a single on August 5, 1997. It placed No. 14 on Mainstream Rock Tracks, No.62 on Australia Top 50, and No. 51 on UK Top 100. The artwork is in a similar style to the original poster art for Vertigo.

Meaning
When asked about the song, Billy Gould replied:

Music video
The music video, directed by Joseph Kahn, is based on Alfred Hitchcock's Vertigo, a film dealing with acrophobia. Shooting occurred during 1997 in San Francisco, California. It features the lead singer, Mike Patton dressed in the same outfit as James Stewart's character, trailing a blonde played by Jennifer Jason Leigh, respectively dressed the same as Vertigos female lead Madeleine. Many scenes are recreated from the film, such as the opening rooftop sequence, Madeleine's plunge into San Francisco bay, Mike moving up and down a stepladder, the belltower sequence complete with the famous Hitchcock Zoom and the psychedelic dream sequence.

The emphasis is mainly on parody, key moments including drummer Mike Bordin sweeping Mike Patton's head in the dream sequence with a broom (presumedly a reference to Vertigo'''s scene where Midge is describing to Scottie that music can clear the cobwebs out of your head like a broom), bassist Billy Gould cross-dressing, Leigh's character being a black wigged sado-masochist, and Leigh fainting when she sees a shadowy figure in the tower, which ends up being drummer Mike Bordin, who at the end of the video casually starts eating a bagel.

ReceptionNME said in June 1997 that the song had "robo-vocals" and "funk-spikiness". CMJ called it one of Album of the Years "best pop songs" in July 1997.

The liner notes for the 2003 compilation This Is It: The Best of Faith No More stated that the song took on "poetic grandeur" following the band's 1998 split.

Consequence of Sound ranked it as the second-greatest Faith No More song in 2015, behind only "Midlife Crisis". In his review for the 2016 deluxe edition of Album of the Year, MXDWN's Sean Hall called the song a "roller coaster ride", remarking, "a bell section that sounds surprisingly like wind chimes functions as a lifesaver to which the listener clings to get themselves through the aggressive guitars, dark bass and creepy vocals, which sound as if they are coming through a radio from The Twilight Zone."

Track listings"Blue Vertigo" cover"Last Cup of Sorrow" (7" Edit) – 3:15
"Pristina (Billy Gould Mix)" – 4:18
"Last Cup of Sorrow (Roli Mosimann Mix)" – 6:26
"Ashes to Ashes (Dillinja Mix)" – 5:30"Orange Vertigo" cover"Last Cup of Sorrow" – 4:12
"Last Cup of Sorrow (Bonehead Mix)" – 4:54
"She Loves Me Not (Spinna Main Mix)" – 4:41
"She Loves Me Not (Spinna Crazy Mix)" – 4:41Japanese track listing'''
"Last Cup of Sorrow" (7" Edit) – 3:15
"Pristina (Billy Gould Mix)" – 4:18
"Last Cup of Sorrow (Roli Mosimann Mix)" – 6:26
"Ashes to Ashes (Dillinja Mix)" – 5:30
"Last Cup of Sorrow (Bonehead Mix)" – 4:54
"She Loves Me Not (Spinna Main Mix)" – 4:41
"She Loves Me Not (Spinna Crazy Mix)" – 4:41

Charts

Footnotes

Faith No More songs
1997 singles
Music videos directed by Joseph Kahn
Songs written by Billy Gould
Songs written by Mike Patton
1997 songs
Slash Records singles